The Kehoe Cup is an annual hurling competition organised by the Leinster Council of the Gaelic Athletic Association (GAA) since 1977 for second- and third-tier inter-county teams in the province of Leinster in Ireland. Nowadays, teams from the provinces of Ulster and Connacht are eligible to compete; formerly, teams from third-level institutions within the three provinces also did. The competition runs each January. Formerly sponsored by Bord na Móna, it was formerly known as the "Bord na Móna Kehoe Cup".

The Kehoe Cup is part of a series of GAA tournaments known as the Leinster GAA Series, along with the Walsh Cup and the O'Byrne Cup. The original purpose of these competitions was to raise funds to supplement an injury scheme for the players. Nowadays, the funds generated are used to alleviate hardship among players, mentors and families who are in financial difficulty. The funds are administered throughout the twelve counties of Leinster. Apart from this, the competitions provide an opportunity for the county teams to select their panel for the year and prepare for the National Hurling League (NHL).

Since the inception of the Kehoe Cup in 1977, a total of 14 teams have won the tournament. Westmeath is the most successful team with 9 titles.

History
In 1954, the Leinster Council established a new inter-county tournament in an effort to raise funds to supplement the medical bills of players who were in financial difficulty. This scheme, known as the Players' Injury Fund, was the first of its kind to be offered by a provincial GAA council. Originally known as the Leinster Accident Fund Tournament, it started as a knockout competition for the 12 counties in Leinster. During the fifties and sixties, the hurling tournament, which became known as the Walsh Cup, was dominated by the stronger hurling counties of Kilkenny and Wexford. As a result of this, the Walsh Cup was not contested for much of the seventies. In 1977, a second cup was presented to the Leinster Council for an alternative hurling competition. The cup was dedicated to former GAA President, Michael Kehoe (Wexford), who died on 8 January 1977. The tournament thus became known as the Kehoe Cup. The Leinster Council decided to alternate it with the Walsh Cup between the stronger and developing counties for the Players' Injury Fund. In its inaugural year, it was contested by the stronger hurling counties and was won by Wexford who beat Kilkenny in the final by 2–13 to 1–15 on 21 August 1977 in Enniscorthy, Co. Wexford. There was a break in the Walsh Cup from 1983 to 1986. When it recommenced in 1987, it was decided by the Leinster Council that the Walsh Cup would be used exclusively for the stronger hurling counties and the Kehoe Cup for the developing counties.

Format

The Kehoe Cup was a straight knockout tournament with each match played as a single leg. The pairings are drawn at random without seeding and the draw usually takes place in November or December of the previous year. The sixteen teams that are drawn to compete in the first round. The eight winning teams from the first round progress to the quarter-finals while the losing teams are drawn against each other to compete for the Kehoe Cup Shield. If a match ends in a draw, it is settled in extra time. However, if the score remains level at the end of extra time, a replay takes place and so on until a winner is found.

The format of the competition remained virtually unchanged since its inception in 1977 until 2015. The most significant change to the tournament was the entry of teams from outside of Leinster. Many of the second- and third-tier inter-county teams in Connacht and Ulster now compete in the Kehoe Cup. Another change to the competition was the entry of teams from third-level institutions. Colleges situated within any of the three provinces were eligible to compete in the Kehoe Cup.

From 2015–18 the tournament was restricted to Leinster county and college teams, and was run on group system, with group winners playing in the final.

Since 2019, only county teams from Leinster and Ulster compete, with no third-level sides. The format and number of teams vary each year.

Sponsorship

In December 2011, the Leinster Council announced a new partnership with Bord na Móna which would provide the competition with a sponsor for the first time in its then 34-year history. This three-year sponsorship deal began in January 2012 and helps fund what is now known as the Bord na Móna Leinster GAA Series, which includes the Kehoe Cup and Shield, Walsh Cup and Shield, and the O'Byrne Cup and Shield. The sponsorship also helps to finance the Leinster GAA's hardship fund, which is the only one of its kind offered by a provincial GAA council and has been in existence since 1954. In the past, this fund has helped local communities, families and players to finance medical bills, rebuild homes lost through tragic circumstances and made financial payments to assist disabled players.

Records and statistics

Roll of honour

No competition in 1979, 1984, 1985 or 2021. Kilkenny and Wexford qualified for the 1980 final but it was never played.

Finals

Kehoe Cup Shield
The Kehoe Cup Shield was a competition between the teams that lose in the first round of the Kehoe Cup. The competition was first held in 2009 when Kildare beat Louth in the final by 4–16 to 1–02.

The 2011 tournament was won by TCD who beat Louth in the final by 1–21 to 2–14.

It was revived in 2019 as a separate tournament.

Records and statistics

Roll of honour

Finals

AET: Abandoned in extra time.

References

External links
The Leinster GAA archive
The official Leinster GAA website
The official GAA website

 
Hurling competitions in Leinster
Hurling cup competitions
Inter-county hurling competitions